River Landscape with Riders is an oil on canvas painting by the Dutch artist Aelbert Cuyp, created c. 1653-1657, now in the Rijksmuseum in Amsterdam, which bought it in 1965 from the Edmond de Rothschild collection in Exbury, Hampshire. The painting is signed at the bottom center 'A. Cuijp'.

Description
The painting depicts two an idyllic scene, where Dutch officers pause by a river to let their horses drink. One of them is watering his horse. Some ducks are also seen in the river. A herdsmen watches, a little further on, while guarding his cows, who rest peacefully, like his dog. Beyond the scene, there are typical Dutch houses, with some country people, with a wagon, and a mountain extends, on the right side. In the background, there is the view of a city, with a visible tower. The cloudy blue sky occupies large part of the upper canvas, extending to the left.  

The mountainous landscape is based on those seen along the River Rhine between Nijmegen and Kleve. Cuyp made various landscape drawings in this area in the early 1650s, which he further elaborated in his studio in Dordrecht.

References

Paintings by Aelbert Cuyp
1650s paintings
Paintings in the collection of the Rijksmuseum
Landscape paintings
Birds in art
Horses in art
Water in art